Kirikou and the Wild Beasts (French: Kirikou et les Bêtes sauvages) is a 2005 French animated feature film. It premiered at the 2005 Cannes Film Festival on 13 May and, unlike its predecessor, received only festival screenings in all English-speaking territories. It was released on English-subtitled DVD-Video in the United States by KimStim (distributed by Kino International) on 29 July 2008 as Kirikou and the Wild Beast.



Synopsis
The film is a sub-story to Kirikou and the Sorceress rather than a straight sequel. The movie is set while Kirikou is still a child and Karaba is still a sorceress. Like Princes et Princesses and Les Contes de la nuit, it is an anthology film comprising several episodic stories, each of them describing Kirikou's interactions with different animals. It is however unique among Michel Ocelot's films, not only in that it is co-directed by Bénédicte Galup (who has previously worked with him as an animator) but also for each of the stories being written by a different person (in all other cases, Ocelot has been the sole writer and director of his films).

Cast
 Pierre-Ndoffé Sarr as Kirikou
 Awa Sene Sarr as Karaba
 Robert Liensol as The grandfather
 Marie-Philomène Nga as The mother
 Emile Abossolo M'Bo as The uncle
 Pascal N'Zonzi as The old man

References

External links

 Official website of Michel Ocelot 
 Kirikou et les Bêtes sauvages official website 
 Kirikou et les bêtes sauvages at the Barbican Centre
 
 
 
 Kirikou et les Bêtes sauvages at Le Palais des dessins animés

French anthology films
2000s children's fantasy films
Films directed by Michel Ocelot
Films set in Africa
French animated fantasy films
2000s French animated films
Vietnamese computer-animated films
Vietnamese animated films
2005 animated films
2005 fantasy films
2005 films
2000s French films